Secourt is a commune in the Moselle department in Grand Est in north-eastern France.

It is located 20 km south east of Montigny-lès-Metz, 26 km south of Metz, 35 km north of Nancy.
its neighbouring villages are Sailly-Achâtel, Vigny and Solgne.

See also
 Communes of the Moselle department

References

External links
 

Communes of Moselle (department)